Sökün is a village in Silifke district of Mersin Province, Turkey. At  it is situated in the delta of Göksu River. It is almost merged to Kurtuluş another village to the southwest of Sökün. The population of Sökün was 566  as of 2011. The main economic activity is farming. The area around the village is fertile. But being a low altitude village, in some years the village suffers flood damage. Almost all crops native to Mediterranean are produced. But strawberry is the most pronounced crop.

References

Villages in Silifke District